Peter Harrison or Pete Harrison may refer to:

 Peter Harrison (architect) (1716–1775), British-born colonial American architect
 Peter Harrison (businessman) (born 1966), British businessman, CEO of Schroders
 Peter Harrison (footballer) (fl. 1995–2012), English footballer, manager and football agent
 Peter Harrison (city planner) (1918–1990), Canberra city planner
 Peter Harrison (historian) (born 1955), professor at the University of Queensland
 Peter Harrison (priest) (born 1939), archdeacon of the East Riding
 Peter Harrison (rugby union) (1934–2011), Bradford RFC player
 Peter G. Harrison (born 1951), professor of computing science at Imperial College London
 P. S. Harrison (1880–1966), also known as Pete Harrison, founder and publisher of Harrison's Reports
 Pete Harrison (1885–1921), English-American baseball umpire

See also 
 Peter Harrison Planetarium, digital laser planetarium situated in Greenwich Park, London
 Peter Harrison (Brookside), a character from the British television series Brookside
 Peter Harryson (born 1948), Swedish actor
 Peter Harris (disambiguation)